William Nicholson Jennings (1860–1946) was a photographer active in Philadelphia from the 1890s. He conducted experiments with color photography and artificial lightning, helping in the development of photographic flash.

External links
William Jennings in The Franklin Institute's Case Files online exhibit Contains biographical information about Jennings, information about his work in the science of lightning and images of Jennings' original photographs

1860 births
1946 deaths
American photographers